Katsuya Uga (born July 21, 1955) is a Japanese jurist who has served as an associate justice of the Supreme Court of Japan since 2019.

Education and Career 
Uga was born on July 21, 1955 in Japan. He attended the University of Tokyo and graduated with a degree in law in 1978. In 1981 he began teaching law at that university. He was promoted to full professor on 2004 and taught until his appointment to the Supreme Court in 2019. He was a visiting researcher/professor at several universities, including Harvard University (in 1983 and in 1990), UC Berkeley (in 1984), and Georgetown University (in 1998).

Supreme Court 
On March 20, 2019, Uga was appointed to the Supreme Court of Japan. In Japan, justices are formally nominated by the Emperor (at that time, Akihito) but in reality the Cabinet chooses the nominees and the Emperor's role is a formality.

Uga's term is scheduled to end on July 20, 2025 (one day before he turns 70). This is because all members of the court have a mandatory retirement age of 70.

References

Living people
1955 births
Japanese judges
University of Tokyo alumni
Academic staff of the University of Tokyo
Supreme Court of Japan justices